Chamira is a genus of flowering plants belonging to the family Brassicaceae.

Its native range is South African Republic.

Species:
 Chamira circaeoides (L.f.) Zahlbr.

References

Brassicaceae
Brassicaceae genera